Rajalakshmi (1930–1965) was a Malayalam writer and poet in India 

Rajalakshmi may also refer to:

Colleges 
 Rajalakshmi Engineering College, Thandalam, Chennai, Tamil Nadu, India, an Engineering College
 Rajalakshmi Institute of Technology, college in Tamil Nadu, India

People 
 Rajalakshmi Parthasarathy (born 1925), Indian journalist, educationist and social worker
 Rajalakshmy (born 1983), Malayalee playback singer
 Rajalakshmi (actress), Telugu actress who acted in all South Indian languages, Sankarabharanam fame
 R. Rajalakshmi (politician), Indian politician
 R. Rajalakshmi (scientist) (1926–2007), Indian biochemist and nutritionist
 T. P. Rajalakshmi (1911–1964), Tamil and Telugu film heroine, director, and producer

Organisations 
 Sri Raja-Lakshmi Foundation, Indian Charitable Trust